See also:
1930s in comics,
1950s in comics and the
list of years in comics


Publications: 1940 - 1941 - 1942 - 1943 - 1944 - 1945 - 1946 - 1947 - 1948 - 1949

Events

1940

The Justice Society of America, the first superhero team in comic book history first appear in All Star Comics #3. The team is conceived by editor Sheldon Mayer and writer Gardner Fox.

Captain America, created by Joe Simon and Jack Kirby, first appears in Captain America Comics #1, published by Timely Comics. Appearing a year.
The Flash

1941

Wonder Woman, created by William Moulton Marston, first appears in All Star Comics #8. She is among the first and most famous comic book superheroines.

Stan Lee becomes editor-in-chief at Timely Comics.

Adventures of Captain Marvel, a twelve-chapter film serial adapted from the popular Captain Marvel comic book character for Republic Pictures, debuts. It was the first film adaptation of a comic book superhero.

Archie Andrews, created by Bob Montana first appears in Pep Comics #22, published by MLJ Magazines.

Plastic Man, created by writer-artist Jack Cole, first appears in Police Comics #1, published by Quality Comics.

1942

Crime Does Not Pay debuts, edited and mostly written by Charles Biro and published by Lev Gleason Publications. It was the first "true crime" comic series and also the first comic in the crime comics genre. One of the most popular comics of its day, at its height the comic wo

1944

Charlton Comics, an American comic book publisher, publishes its first title, Yellowjacket, an anthology of superhero and horror stories, under the imprint Frank Comunale Publications. The company would begin publishing under the Charlton name in 1946.

Superboy, the adventures of Superman as a boy, first appears in More Fun Comics #101. The character is currently the subject of a legal battle between Time Warner, the owner of DC Comics, and the estate of Jerry Siegel. The Siegel estate claims that the original "Superboy" character published by DC Comics is an independent creation that used ideas from Jerry Siegel's original rejected pitch and was created without his consent.

1945

1946

The All-Winners Squad, the first superhero team in the Marvel Universe, first appears in All Winners Comics #19, published by Timely Comics.

Sazae-san, by Machiko Hasegawa debuts in Fukunichi Shimbun.

1947

Li'l Folks, the first comic strip by Peanuts creator Charles M. Schulz, debuts mainly in Schulz's hometown paper, the St. Paul Pioneer Press, on June 22. Li'l Folks can almost be regarded as an embryonic version of Peanuts, containing characters and themes which were to reappear in the later strip: a well-dressed young man with a fondness for Beethoven a la Schroeder, a dog with a striking resemblance to Snoopy, and even a boy named Charlie Brown.

1948

The Association of Comics Magazine Publishers (ACMP) forms on July 1, 1948, to regulate the content of comic books in the face of increasing public criticism. Founding members included publishers Leverett Gleason of Lev Gleason Publications, Bill Gaines of EC Comics, Harold Moore (publisher of Famous Funnies) and Rae Herman of Orbit Publications. Henry Schultz served as executive director.

1949

Publications

1940

Daring Mystery Comics #1 - Timely Comics
Red Raven Comics #1 - Timely Comics
Human Torch Comics #2 renamed from Red Raven Comics - Timely Comics
Mystic Comics #1 - Timely Comics
Double Action Adventure #2, January  - National Periodicals - DC
Double Action Detective #3, February  - National Periodicals - DC
Flash Comics #1 - All American Comics
The Flame #1, Summer - Fox Comics
Rex Dexter of Mars #1, July - Fox Comics
The Blue Bolt #1, June - Fox Comics
Weird Comics #1, July - Fox Comics

1941

All Winners Comics #1 - Timely Comics
Captain America Comics #1 - March, 1941, Timely Comics
Human Torch Comics #5 renumbered from #6 - Timely Comics
Sub-Mariner Comics #1 - Timely Comics
USA Comics #1 - Timely Comics
Young Allies Comics #1 - Timely Comics

1942

Comedy Comics #9 renamed from Daring Mystery Comics - Marvel Comics
Crime Does Not Pay #1 - Lev Gleason Publications
Joker Comics #1 - Marvel Comics
Krazy Komics #1 - Marvel Comics
Terry-Toons Comics #1 - Marvel Comics
Tough Kid Squad Comics #1 - Marvel Comics

1943

All Select Comics #1 - Marvel Comics
All Surprise Comics #1 - Marvel Comics
Kid Komics #1 - Marvel Comics
Miss Fury Comics #1 - Marvel Comics
Powerhouse Pepper Comics #1 - Marvel Comics
The United States Marines #1-8 changes publisher to Magazine Enterprises / Sussex Pb in 1952 - William H Wise & Company

1944

Amazing Comics #1 - Marvel Comics
Comic Capers #1 - Marvel Comics
Daring Comics #9 revived and renamed from Daring Mystery Comics - Marvel Comics
Animated Funny Comics-Tunes #16 spin-off from Krazy Komics - Marvel Comics
Gay Comics #1 - Marvel Comics
Gay Comics #18 spin-off from Animated Funny Comics-Tunes - Marvel Comics
Ideal Comics #1 - Marvel Comics
Junior Miss #1 - Marvel Comics
Miss America Comics #1 - Marvel Comics
Miss America Magazine #2 renamed from Miss America Comics - Marvel Comics
Mystic Comics #1 - Marvel Comics
Super Rabbit #1 - Marvel Comics
Tessie the Typist #1 - Marvel Comics
Ziggy Pig Silly Seal Comics #1 - Marvel Comics

1945

Animated Movie-Tunes #1 - Marvel Comics
Complete Comics #2 renamed from Amazing Comics - Marvel Comics
Dopey Duck Comics #1 - Marvel Comics
Funny Frolics #1 - Marvel Comics
Georgie Comics #1 - Marvel Comics
Komic Kartoons #1 - Marvel Comics
Krazy Krow #1 - Marvel Comics
Millie the Model #1 - Marvel Comics
Miss America Magazine #1 renumbered from #7 - Marvel Comics
Miss America Magazine #1 renumbered from #7 (#13) - Marvel Comics
Nellie the Nurse #1 - Marvel Comics
Patsy Walker #1 - Marvel Comics
Silly Tunes #1 - Marvel Comics

1946

Kid Movie Komics #11 renamed from Kid Komics - Marvel Comics
Mighty Mouse #1 - Marvel Comics
Miss America Magazine #1 renumbered from #7 (#19) - Marvel Comics
Miss America Magazine #1 renumbered from #7 (#25) - Marvel Comics
Movie Tunes Comics #3 renamed from Animated Movie-Tunes - Marvel Comics
Wacky Duck Comics #3 renamed from Dopey Duck Comics - Marvel Comics
Willie Comics #5 renamed from Ideal Comics - Marvel Comics

1947

All Teen Comics #20 renamed from All Winners Comics - Marvel Comics
Blonde Phantom #12 renamed from All Select Comics - Marvel Comics
Cindy Comics #27 renamed from Krazy Komics - Marvel Comics
Frankie Comics #4 renamed from Movie Tunes Comics - Marvel Comics
Jeanie Comics #13 renamed from All Surprise Comics - Marvel Comics
Junior Miss #24 spin-off from Human Torch Comics - Marvel Comics
Justice Comics #7 renamed from Wacky Duck Comics - Marvel Comics
Hedy De Vine Comics #22 spin-off from Teen Comics - Marvel Comics
Margie Comics #35 renamed from Comedy Comics - Marvel Comics
Miss America Magazine #1 renumbered from #7 (#31) - Marvel Comics
Miss America Magazine #1 renumbered from #4 (#34) - Marvel Comics
Official True Crime Cases #23 spin-off from Sub-Mariner Comics - Marvel Comics
Oscar Comics #24 renamed from Funny Comics Tunes - Marvel Comics
Oscar Comics #3 renumbered from #26 - Marvel Comics
Rusty Comics #12 renamed from Kid Movie Komics - Marvel Comics
Teen Comics #21 renamed from All Teen Comics - Marvel Comics

1948

All Winners Comics #1 - Marvel Comics
All-True Crime Cases #26 renamed from Official True Crime Cases - Marvel Comics
Annie Oakley #1 - Marvel Comics
Blackstone the Magician #2 renamed from Blackstone the Magician Detective Fights Crime - Marvel Comics
Blackstone the Magician Detective #3 renamed from Blackstone the Magician - Marvel Comics
Blaze Carson #1 - Marvel Comics
Comedy Comics #1 - Marvel Comics
Complete Mystery #1 - Marvel Comics
Crime Exposed #1 - Marvel Comics
Crimefighters #1 - Marvel Comics
Frankie and Lana #13 renamed from Frankie Comics - Marvel Comics
Ideal Comics #1 - Marvel Comics
Justice Comics #4 renumbered from #10 - Marvel Comics
Kid Colt #1 - Marvel Comics
Krazy Komics #1 - Marvel Comics
Lana #1 - Marvel Comics
Lawbreakers Always Loose! #1 - Marvel Comics
Mitzi Comics #1 - Marvel Comics
Mitzi's Boyfriend #2 renamed from Mitzi Comics - Marvel Comics
My Romance #1 - Marvel Comics
Namora #1 - Marvel Comics
Spirou et l'aventure by Jijé, Dupuis
Spirou et Fantasio by André Franquin, Dupuis
Sun Girl #1 - Marvel Comics
Tex Morgan #1 - Marvel Comics
Tex Taylor #1 - Marvel Comics
Two-Gun Kid #1 - Marvel Comics
Venus #1 - Marvel Comics
Wacky Duck #1 - Marvel Comics
Wild West #1 - Marvel Comics
Wild Western #3 renamed from Wild West - Marvel Comics
Witness #1 - Marvel Comics

1949

Actual Romances #1 - Marvel Comics
All True Crime #35 renamed from All True Crime Cases - Marvel Comics
All Western Winners #2 renamed from All Winners Comics - Marvel Comics
Amazing Mysteries #32 spin-off from Sub-Mariner Comics - Marvel Comics
Awful Oscar #11 renamed from Oscar Comics - Marvel Comics
Best Love #33 spin-off from Sub-Mariner Comics Marvel Comics
Best Western #58 revived and renamed from Terry-Toons Comics - Marvel Comics
Blaze the Wonder Collie #2 renamed from Mollie Manton's Romances - Marvel Comics
Casey Crime Photographer #1 - Marvel Comics
Cowboy Romances #1 - Marvel Comics
Cupid #1 - Marvel Comics
Faithful #1 - Marvel Comics
Film Funnies #1 - Marvel Comics
Frankie Fuddle #16 renamed from Frankie and Lana - Marvel Comics
Girl Comics #1 - Marvel Comics
Kid Colt Outlaw #5 renamed from Kid Colt - Marvel Comics
Li'l Willie #21 renamed from Willie Comics - Marvel Comics
Little Aspirin #1 - Marvel Comics
Little Lana #1 renamed from Lana - Marvel Comics
Little Lenny #1 - Marvel Comics
Little Lizzie #1 - Marvel Comics
Love Adventures #1 - Marvel Comics
Love Classics #1 - Marvel Comics
Love Dramas #1 - Marvel Comics
Love Romances #1 renamed from Ideal Comics - Marvel Comics
Love Dramas #1 - Marvel Comics
Love Secrets #1 - Marvel Comics
Love Tales #36 spin-off from Human Torch Comics - Marvel Comics
Lovers #23 renamed from Blonde Phantom - Marvel Comics
Rex Hart #6 renamed from Blaze Carson - Marvel Comics
Man Comics #1 - Marvel Comics
Marvel Tales #93 renamed from Marvel Mystery Comics - Marvel Comics
Mitzi's Romances #8 renamed from Mitzi's Boyfriend - Marvel Comics
Mollie Manton's Romances #1 - Marvel Comics
My Diary #1 - Marvel Comics
My Love #1 - Marvel Comics
My Own Romance #4 renamed from My Romance - Marvel Comics
Oscar Comics #13 renamed from Awful Oscar - Marvel Comics
Our Love #1 - Marvel Comics
Rangeland Love #1 - Marvel Comics
Romance Diary #1 - Marvel Comics
Romance Tales #7 spin-off from Western Winners - Marvel Comics
Romances of the West #1 - Marvel Comics
Sports Stars #1 - Marvel Comics
Suspense #1 - Marvel Comics
Tiny Tessie #24 renamed from Tessie the Typist - Marvel Comics
True Adventures #3 renamed from True Western - Marvel Comics
True Complete Mystery #5 renamed from Complete Mystery - Marvel Comics
True Life Tales #1 - Marvel Comics
True Western #1 - Marvel Comics
Western Life Romances #1 - Marvel Comics
Western Outlaws and Sheriffs #60 renamed from Best Western - Marvel Comics
Western Winners #5 renamed from All Western Winners - Marvel Comics
Wonder Duck #1 - Marvel Comics
Young Hearts #1 - Marvel Comics

References

 
1940s decade overviews